Voetbal International (VI) is a Dutch football magazine. It is the oldest Dutch football magazine that is still running.

History and Profile
Voetbal International was established in 1965. VI was one of the founding members of ESM. It left the group in 2007. Voetbal International was acquired in 2019 by the publishing house Digital Enterprises. The chief editors of the magazine are Freek Jansen, Peter Wekking and Pieter Zwart. The magazine has had a sharply declining circulation in recent years. In the first quarter of 2022, the total paid weekly circulation was 36,586 magazines. 

In addition to the regular magazine that comes out every Wednesday, VI every summer publishes season previews before the start of the Dutch league season. For years they have made a guide for the Dutch season, including the fixture lists and information and statistics of every Eredivisie and Eerste Divisie team and its players. They have also issued season previews of the English, German, French, Belgian and Spanish competitions as well as for the Dutch Hoofdklasse, the highest amateur league.

Weekly circulation of Voetbal International
Total paid targeted circulation according to HOI, Instituut voor Media Auditing and Nationaal Onderzoek Multimedia.
1970: 105,272
1985: 176,231
1990: 198,253
1995: 209,286
2000: 188,209
2011: 155,491
2016: 85,445
2020: 41,993
2022 Q3: 34,539

Football Yearbook
From 1978, VI had published a Dutch Football Yearbook every year, with a review of the Dutch professional leagues and their national football team as well as international tournaments. Since 2006 they publish the Brinvest Voetbaljaarboek.

Television Programme
Since 2008, a programme aired by RTL 7 (Netherlands) is called Voetbal International as well. The show was formerly known as Voetbal Insite, but had to be sponsored to assure its future. Since that moment, former football player René van der Gijp has been made a series regular, after Willem van Hanegem quit the job. Voetbal International's editor Johan Derksen has a permanent place as an analyser. The show is being broadcast every Monday and Friday evening at 20:30 during the football season and lasts ninety minutes.

On 21 October 2011 Voetbal International was awarded the 'Golden Television Ring 2011' for best television program of the year.

VI Eredivisie Best Player of the Year 
Voetbal International has been awarding the VI Eredivisie Best Player of the Year since 2016. The award is based on the magazine's ranking of the players' performance in the league.

Top 100 Footballers Of All Time 
On 7 June 2017, the magazine elected Argentine Lionel Messi as the best footballer in history, after a voting that took place in order to rank the top 100 footballers of all time.

Messi won the poll earning the number one spot ahead of compatriot Diego Maradona and Dutch legend Johan Cruyff, that came second and third respectively.

The top 7 list is as follows :

Other placings are listed as below:

References

External links

 Official website (www.vi.nl) (in Dutch)

1965 establishments in the Netherlands
Association football magazines
Sports magazines published in the Netherlands
Dutch-language magazines
Weekly magazines published in the Netherlands
Magazines established in 1965